The 2011 Rally Finland was the eighth round of the 2011 World Rally Championship season. The rally took place over 28–30 July, and was based in Jyväskylä, with a remote service in Lahti. The rally was also the fifth round of the Super 2000 World Rally Championship, the fourth round of the Production World Rally Championship and the third round of the WRC Academy.

Championship leader Sébastien Loeb won for the second time in Finland, taking his 66th career victory in the process, ahead of rivals Jari-Matti Latvala, Sébastien Ogier and Mikko Hirvonen. With an overall tenth place, Juho Hänninen took the honours in SWRC, Hayden Paddon took his third consecutive win in PWRC, and Egon Kaur continued his perfect record in WRC Academy.

Entry List

Results

Event standings

† – The WRC Academy featured 18 of the rally's 22 stages.

Special stages

Power Stage
The "Power stage" was a live, televised  stage at the end of the rally, held in Laajavuori.

References

External links 

 Results at eWRC.com

Finland
Rally Finland
Rally